Rangell may refer to:

People
 Bobby Rangell (b. c 1958), American jazz musician, Nelson Rangell's brother
 Johan Wilhelm Rangell (1894–1982), Finnish banker, prime minister 
 Leo Rangell (1913–2011), American psychoanalyst
 Nelson Rangell (b. 1960), American jazz musician, Bobby Rangell's brother